Panasonic Lumix DMC-FX77 is a digital camera by Panasonic Lumix. The highest-resolution pictures it records is 14.1 megapixels, through its 24mm Ultra Wide-Angle Leica DC VARIO-SUMMICRON.

Property
2.5 LEICA DC VARIO-SUMMARIT Lens with 24mm Ultra Wide-Angle and 5x Optical Zoom
Full HD Movie: 1.920 x 1.080
LCD Touch-control 3,5"
CCD HS 12.1 megapixels and Intelligent Zoom 6.5x

References

External links
DMC-FX77 on panasonic.it
Panasonic Lumix DMC-FX77 review

Bridge digital cameras
FX77